Kyriakos Dimosthenous (born March 4, 1980) is a Cypriot former swimmer, who specialized in breaststroke events. Dimosthenous qualified for the men's 100 m breaststroke at the 2004 Summer Olympics in Athens, by achieving a FINA B-standard of 1:04.74 from the Greek Open Championships in Piraeus. He challenged seven other swimmers in heat three, including 15-year-old Nguyen Huu Viet of Vietnam. He edged out Estonia's Aleksander Baldin to take a sixth spot by a tenth of a second (0.10) with a time of 1:05.54. Dimosthenous failed to advance into the semifinals, as he placed forty-sixth overall out of 60 swimmers on the first day of preliminaries.

References

1980 births
Living people
Cypriot male swimmers
Olympic swimmers of Cyprus
Swimmers at the 2004 Summer Olympics
Male breaststroke swimmers
20th-century Cypriot people
21st-century Cypriot people